Part of the famous Hotel Gellért in Buda, the Gellért Thermal Baths and Swimming Pool, also known simply as the Gellért Baths (Hungarian: Gellért gyógyfürdő), is a bath complex in Budapest in Hungary.

History
The bath complex was built between 1912 and 1918 in the (Secession) Art Nouveau style. It was damaged during World War II but then rebuilt. References to healing waters in this location are found from as early as the 13th century. A hospital was located on this site during the Middle Ages. During the reign of the Ottoman Empire, baths were also built on this particular site.
The "magical healing spring" was used by the Turkish during the 16th and 17th centuries. The bath was called Sárosfürdő ("muddy" bath) because the mineral mud settled at the bottom of pools.

Reconstructive work
The Gellért Bath underwent its first extensive renovation in 2008. The bath closed only once in its almost century-long existence due to a burst pipe. The Gellért was open even during World War II. Towards the end of the war, the prestigious Art Nouveau women's thermal bath was bombed, destroying the Zsolnay pyrogranite façade and the wooden interior of the dressing rooms. Due to economic condition following the war, the thermal bath was redesigned in a much more puritanical manner. The 2008 reconstruction served to restore the bath to its original splendor.

Pools and treatments 

The Gellért Baths complex includes thermal baths, which are small pools containing water from Gellért hill's mineral hot springs. The water contains calcium, magnesium, hydrocarbonate, alkalis, chloride, sulfate, and fluoride. Medical indications of the water includes degenerative joint illnesses, spine problems, chronic and sub-acute joint inflammations, vertebral disk problems, neuralgia, vasoconstriction and circulatory disturbances; inhalation problems for the treatment of asthma and chronic bronchitis problems. The temperature of the water is between 35 °C and 40 °C.The thermal baths are decorated beautifully with mosaic tiles.

Gellért Spa is famous for its main hall with gallery and glass roof, built in Art-Nouveau style.

The current bath complex and hotel was opened in 1918 and was expanded in 1927 and 1934 with an artificial wave pool and with a bubble bath.

The complex also includes saunas and plunge pools (segregated by gender), an open-air swimming pool which can create artificial waves every 30 minutes and an effervescent swimming pool. A Finnish sauna with cold pool is also enclosed within the complex. Masseuse services are available.

The Gellért Baths were originally separated for ladies and men. Starting in January 2013, all pools are mixed gendered, although it still has two different sections.

Gellért Baths also offer a range of medical services. Towels and swimsuits may be bought in the Spa (renting is no longer allowed following measures against the COVID-19 pandemic). On holidays and at weekends the entrance fee is higher than on workdays. In June 2014, the prices were between 4900 and 5100 HUF. Massage is charged extra (4400 HUF for a basic massage). (Current prices: see external link below.)

Filming location
The Gellért Baths have been used as a filming location for the following projects:
 Accumulator 1 (1994) directed by Jan Sverák
 Cremaster 5 (1997) part of The Cremaster Cycle directed by Matthew Barney
 Víz (Pools of Desire) (1999) directed by Layne Derrick
K-12 (2019) directed by Melanie Martinez

Notes

References 
 Budapest. DK Eyewitness Travel Guides (2004)
 1000 Places to See Before You Die
 Épülettár.hu

External links 
 Danubius Hotels Gellért Baths site
 Gellért Baths virtual tour 

Buildings and structures completed in 1918
Thermal baths in Budapest
Landmarks in Hungary
Art Nouveau architecture in Budapest